Trausella is a comune (municipality) in the Metropolitan City of Turin in the Italian region Piedmont, located about  north of Turin, in the Val Chiusella.

References

Cities and towns in Piedmont
Valchiusa